Luciano "Lou" Mariñas Veloso (born January 7, 1948) is a Filipino actor, comedian, director and politician. He is known for his supporting roles in over 30 comedy films, which include Mga Kwento ni Lola Basyang (1985), Pulis Patola (1993), Ang Cute ng Ina Mo (2007), and Desperadas 2 (2008). As an actor, Veloso has also performed in films such as Kabayo Kids, released in 1990, in which he portrayed Loreiga, Buddy en Sol (Sine Ito!) (1992), and M & M: The Incredible Twins (1989).

Early career
Veloso's first film was Working Girls under VIVA Films in 1984 in which he played a security guard in a bank office. Veloso was also a TV host of AgriSiyete, which he replaced original host the late comedian Bert Marcelo in 1996. He also appeared in a various educational programs are Batibot and K-High which he plays as a grandfather.

Senakulo stage play
He is also the founder and musical stage play director of "Martir sa Golgota", a senakulo or passion play, launched in 1979 which was traditionally held every Holy Week of every year in Manila.

Political career
Veloso was elected councilor of the 6th district of Manila from 1995 to 2004 and from 2007 until 2013. He ran for vice mayor on the 2013 midterm elections under the Liberal Party with Mayor Alfredo Lim but lost to incumbent Vice Mayor Isko Moreno. He ran in 2016 for councilor under KABAKA but lost, placing eighth.

He successfully returned to the city council in 2019, running under the Team Legacy ticket of PMP led by Mayor Joseph Estrada. He was re-elected in 2022, this time under Asenso Manileño.

He was notably the author of a resolution in 1996 seeking the renovation of the Manila City Hall's Clock Tower. The renovation only started years later, until it was completed and inaugurated as the Manila Clock Tower Museum in 2022.

Filmography

Film

Television

References

External links
 

1948 births
Filipino actor-politicians
Filipino male comedians
Filipino film directors
Filipino male film actors
Filipino male television actors
Aksyon Demokratiko politicians
Liberal Party (Philippines) politicians
Pwersa ng Masang Pilipino politicians
Living people
Male actors from Manila
Manila City Council members
GMA Network personalities
ABS-CBN personalities
TV5 (Philippine TV network) personalities
Filipino theatre directors